Saath Sobat is an 2023 Indian Marathi-language romantic drama film written and directed by Ramesh More and produced by Dhanaji Maru under the banner of Maru Enterprises. It was theatrically released on 13 January 2023.

Cast 

 Sangram Samel 
 Mrunal Kulkarni 
 Mohan Joshi
 Anil Gawas

Release 
The film was theatrically released on 13 January 2023 in Maharashtra.

References

External links 

 

Upcoming Indian films
2023 films
Indian romantic drama films
Indian romance films